The 1979 All-Ireland Senior Club Camogie Championship for the leading clubs in the women's team field sport of camogie was won by Buffers Alley from Wexford, who defeated Athenry from Galway in the final, played at Athenry .

Arrangements
The championship was organised on the traditional provincial system used in Gaelic Games since the 1880s, with Ballyagran and Portglenone winning the championships of the other two provinces. Fiona Cousins, Teresa Hobbs, Dorothy Walsh and Bridie Doran scored Alley’s goal as they dethroned the champions Ballyagran in the semi-final.

The Final
The final was played in miserable weather and underfoot conditions. Agnes Hourigan wrote in the Irish Press: Buffers Alley were rewarded for their dedication and promotion of the games in the Monamolin-Kilmuckridge district of Wexford when they won the All Ireland club title for the first time at Athenry. They overcame the heavy pitch conditions much more effectively than the lighter local team. Their striking was longer, their combination better and this, allied to their determination, added up to a successful performance.

Final stages

References

External links
 Camogie Association

1979 in camogie
1979